O' Faby is a 1993 Indian Malayalam-language film. It was Asia's first full-length live action/animation hybrid feature film. It is directed by Sreekumar Krishnan Nair and stars Nagesh, Thilakan, Roque Tharakan, Manoj K. Jayan and Srividya. The director of animation was Ram Mohan, known as the father of Indian animation. Famous singers KJ Yesudas, KS Chithra and SP Balasubrahmanyam sing songs with lyrics penned by Bichu Thirumala. The cinematography team included Jayanan Vincent, Ramachandra Babu and Venugopal Madathil.

Plot 
O' Faby tells the story of the friendship between the hero and the animated character, Faby. The producer's son Roque played the hero role. The hero experiences many troubles but is saved by Faby.

Cast 

Shammi Thilakan as Faby (voice cast for an animation character)
Roque Tharakan as Sandy (voiced by Sudheesh)
Nagesh as Muthu Swami
Thilakan as Commissioner Nair
Srividya as Sophie
Devan as John
Nassar as SI Sekher
Ilavarasi as Jeni
Manoj K. Jayan as SI Siby
Krishnankutty Nair as Slum man
NL Balakrishnan as Fernandez
Philomina as Mary
Subair as CI Jayashankar
Jagathy Sreekumar as Rappai
Narendra Prasad as Saint
Raghavan as PC Rajaram
Mamukkoya as Tea seller
Sukumari as Slum Lady
Divya Unni as Child Artist
Sandra Thomas as Child Artist
Sachith Soju as Child Artist
Shajith as Kishore
Rafeeq as Christopher

Production

Development 
K. Sreekuttan, son of veteran director M. Krishnan Nair decided to make a live-action animated film after watching Who Framed Roger Rabbit and wanted to attempt similar experiment in Malayalam. Simon Tharakan, an NRI who learned of a news article about a mechanical robot founded by Sreekuttan's friend Sabu travelled to India to meet the inventor and he decided to produce a film.

Sabu and Tharakan decided to have Sreekuttan to handle the direction after observing his work on the sets of Sargam. Sreekuttan expressed his interest to do a live-action animated film to which they agreed. Tharakan came up with a concept based on character Fagin from Oliver Twist. Tharakan's son Roquey was chosen to portray the film's main protagonist.

Filming 
To make actors react and emote to the animated character, Sreekuttan chosen Raghu of Mela to play human version of Faby and a costume was created to resemble the sketches of Faby and given to Raghu. After this, the scenes were shot again leaving spaces to be “filled in later” with the animated figures.

For the post-production to include animation, makers met Ram Mohan, father of animation who scolded them for making a film without employing an animator for pre-production and for not story boarding the film however he then gave them drawings for the cartoon characters along with a template of expressions for each situation. Makers had problems in including the animated sequences to the footage so a basic Click 3 camera was bought and a halogen light was fixed onto it, "Each film from O’ Faby's reels was then fixed onto the Click 3 camera for the image to get magnified, making the tracing simpler". Around 50 artists too were hired full-time to sketch the cartoon characters into cel sheets which went on for more than a year. The film's budget was around 1.4. crores.

Soundtrack 
Soundtrack was composed by Johnson.
O Faby - K. J. Yesudas
Rajapakshi - K. J. Yesudas
Dingara Dinga - S. P. Balasubrahmanyam
Thaaazhathum - K. S. Chithra

Release 
Simon Tharakan who produced the film had distributed it all by himself. The film was released in August 1993 despite hype, the film failed at the box-office.

References

External links 
 

1993 films
Indian animated films
1990s Malayalam-language films
Indian films with live action and animation
1990s children's fantasy films
Indian children's fantasy films
1993 animated films
Films directed by Sreekumar Krishnan Nair